Michael Hedges is a sound engineer from Wellington, New Zealand. He attended Naenae College. He has won two Academy Awards for Best Sound Mixing and has been nominated for another two in the same category. He has worked on more than 70 films since 1990.

Selected filmography
Hedges has won two Academy Awards and has been nominated for another:

Won
 The Lord of the Rings: The Return of the King (2003)
 King Kong (2005)

Nominated
 The Lord of the Rings: The Two Towers (2002)
 The Hobbit: The Desolation of Smaug (2013)
 Avatar: The Way of Water (2022)

References

External links

Year of birth missing (living people)
Living people
New Zealand audio engineers
Best Sound Mixing Academy Award winners
People from Wellington City
Primetime Emmy Award winners